Stuart Ashton Staples (born 14 November 1965 in Basford, Nottinghamshire) is an English musician best known as the lead singer of indie band Tindersticks, in which he also plays guitar. Staples is noted for his recognisable crooning vocal style and a distinctively low, nasal voice.

Biography
Prior to co-founding Tindersticks, Staples played in a band called Asphalt Ribbons, whose final line-up was nearly identical to that of his later band. He has released two solo albums: Lucky Dog Recordings 03-04 and Leaving Songs.

Staples is also active as a film composer. He has provided the soundtrack to many of Claire Denis's films, including L'Intrus (2004), White Material (2009), and High Life (2018). Tindersticks had previously recorded the music to two other Denis films, Nénette et Boni and Trouble Every Day. In 2007 Staples collaborated with David Boulter on the soundtrack to Tot Ziens! (We'll meet Again), a short by Belgian director Klaus Verscheure, and he also provided the music for the 2019 film Vers la bataille, the fourth film by Aurélien Vernhes-Lermusiaux.

In 2017, the British Film Institute released Minute Bodies, a film he directed and scored with Christine Ott and Thomas Belhom of films by the naturalist F. Percy Smith.

Solo discography

Albums
Lucky Dog Recordings 03-04 (2005), Beggars Banquet
Leaving Songs (2006), Beggars Banquet
Songs for the Young at Heart (2007, with Dave Boulter)
Arrhythmia (2018)

References

External links

1965 births
Living people
English rock singers
English male singers
English rock guitarists
English film score composers
English male film score composers
People from Nottingham
English male guitarists